Patrick Cutrone (born 3 January 1998) is an Italian professional footballer who plays as a striker for  club Como.

Club career

AC Milan
Cutrone was born in Como and began to play football at a young age. In 2005, the 7-year old Cutrone started his youth career at the local team GS Parediense. In the summer of 2007, he had trials at Internazionale, Monza, and AC Milan. On 29 June 2007 he officially joined Milan's academy, where he spent the following ten years, playing through the different age groups up to the Primavera (under-19) team. In March 2015, Cutrone signed his first professional contract with Milan, effective from 1 July 2015 until 30 June 2018.

Cutrone received his first ever call-up to the senior team for a home game against Pescara played on 30 October 2016; he was an unused substitute. In January 2017, Cutrone was promoted to Milan's first team. On 21 May 2017, he made his senior debut in the 3–0 Serie A home win against Bologna, coming on as a substitute for Gerard Deulofeu at the 85th minute.

In the summer of 2017, Cutrone signed a contract extension until 30 June 2021, while Milan's Chinese-led board of directors spent over €200 million on transfers, acquiring a total of 11 new players, two of which were strikers André Silva and Nikola Kalinić. Initially, in order to increase his playing time, Cutrone had been persuaded to join one of the lower-ranking Serie A clubs yet refused.

On 27 July 2017, he was featured in the starting line-up for the first time in a 1–0 away victory over Romanian side Universitatea Craiova in the 2017–18 Europa League qualification. On 3 August, he scored his first goal for Milan in the return match of the same tie, which finished 2–0 for his team. On 20 August, he scored his first Serie A goal in a 0–3 Serie A away win against Crotone. On 24 August, he scored the only goal in a 1–0 away victory over Shkëndija in Europa League playoffs, and on 28 September, he scored a last-minute winning goal against Rijeka in the group stage to win the match 3–2 for Milan. Coming on as a substitute in the Coppa Italia match against local rivals, Internazionale, Cutrone scored the winner and his first goal in the Derby della Madonnina.

On 28 January 2018, Cutrone scored an opening goal in the home Serie A game against Lazio. Initially, the goal was thought to be a header by the referee and Lazio players alike. However, after the final whistle, it became clear that following a free kick taken by Hakan Çalhanoğlu, the ball instead deflected off his arm straight into the goal. Although it was reported that Cutrone may possibly get a two-match ban for an alleged deliberate handball, an investigation conducted by governing body the FIGC proved that his actions in that episode were unintentional and, therefore, non-punishable. On 10 February 2018, Cutrone scored a brace in a 4–0 away victory over SPAL.

In the summer of 2018, Milan's new board of directors decided to increase the team's attacking capability with the signing of a high-profile goalscorer, Gonzalo Higuaín, whom Cutrone first met in 2015 as a fan. Following his arrival, out of all the remaining strikers in the team (namely Nikola Kalinić, André Silva, and Carlos Bacca), Cutrone was the only one to have not been placed on the transfer market. On 31 August 2018, Cutrone came on as a late substitute and scored a last-minute match-winning goal in a 2018–19 Serie A home game against Roma (2–1), helping Milan secure the very first competitive victory in the season.

In October 2018, Cutrone extended his contract with Milan until 30 June 2023.

On 12 January 2019, Cutrone came on as an extra-time substitute and scored two first-touch goals within just six minutes in an eventual Coppa Italia 2–0 away win against Sampdoria. In the same month, the club opted for an early termination of Gonzalo Higuaín's loan and bought Krzysztof Piątek as a first-choice striker, whose role on the pitch and style of play were considered "too similar" with those of Cutrone. The team's head coach, Gennaro Gattuso, also refused to pair strikers for tactical reasons and preferred 4–3–3 as his regular starting formation. As a result, Cutrone's playing time and quality of performances continued to decrease, with the player failing to score or assist in his 18 consecutive appearances, mostly as a super-sub. As Milan once again failed to qualify for the Champions League, Gattuso resigned and was replaced by Marco Giampaolo. Despite Giampaolo favoring 4–3–1–2 over any other formation, Cutrone's opportunities at Milan were still considered limited as the new coach sought to pair Piątek with a different type of an attacking partner than him.

Wolverhampton Wanderers
On 30 July 2019, Cutrone joined Wolverhampton Wanderers on a four-year contract. Cutrone made his league debut for Wolves as a substitute in their opening Premier League fixture of the 2019–20 season, a 0–0 away draw with Leicester City on 11 August, having made his debut appearance (also as a substitute) in the club's 2019–20 UEFA Europa League match away to FC Pyunik of Armenia three days earlier. On 15 August, Cutrone made his full debut for Wolves in a 4–0 home win against FC Pyunik in the 2nd Leg of the UEFA Europa League Third Qualifying Round. Cutrone made his full Premier League debut for Wolves in a 3–2 away defeat to Everton on 1 September. His first goal for Wolves came on 14 September, in a 2–5 home loss to Chelsea in the Premier League. In a 2–0 home success against West Ham United on 4 December 2019, Cutrone scored having only been on the pitch for two minutes as an 84th minute substitute.

On 10 January 2020, Cutrone left Wolves to join Fiorentina on an 18-month loan deal, which included an option for the Italian club to buy the player.

On 7 January 2021, Cutrone returned to Wolverhampton Wanderers after just under a year out on loan at Fiorentina, wearing the number 23 shirt, representing his age at the time of return. His first appearance for Wolves in the 2020–21 season was as a second-half substitute in Wolves's 1–0 home victory over Crystal Palace in a FA Cup 3rd round tie on 8 January 2021. Cutrone made his first start for Wolves since his return from loan in a FA Cup 4th Round tie away to non-league Chorley on 22 January 2021, a game Wolves won 1–0.

On 31 January 2021 Wolves announced that Cutrone would be going out on loan to La Liga club Valencia for the remainder of the 2020–21 season.

Fiorentina (loan)
Cutrone joined Fiorentina on an 18-month loan deal on 10 January 2020. Two days later he made his debut, as a 75th-minute substitute for Federico Chiesa in a 1–0 home win over SPAL. On 15 January, he scored to open a 2–1 win over Atalanta in the last 16 of the Coppa Italia, also at the Stadio Artemio Franchi.

On 7 January 2021, Cutrone was recalled by Wolverhampton Wanderers. However, despite making four appearances within three weeks at the club, Cutrone was once again sent on loan at the end of the month.

Valencia (loan)
On 31 January 2021, La Liga club Valencia announced the signing of Cutrone on loan for the remainder of the 2020–21 season.

Empoli (loan)
Cutrone returned to Italy ahead of the 2021–22 season, to play for Empoli, which just earned promotion to Serie A.

Como 
On 29 August 2022, Cutrone was signed by hometown club Como in the Serie B on a three-year contract.

International career
Cutrone represented Italy at Italy under-15, under-16, under-17, under-18 and under-19 level, making a combine total of 57 appearances and scoring 27 goals. In particular, he was part of the squad for both the 2015 European U-17 Championship and the 2016 European U-19 Championship.

He made his debut with the Italy U21 team on 1 September 2017, in a friendly match lost 3–0 against Spain. Three days later, he played his second match against Slovenia U21 in which he scored his first goal for the side in a 4–1 victory.

In March 2018, he was awarded his first senior call-up to the Italy national team, under interim manager Luigi Di Biagio, for Italy's friendlies against Argentina and England later that month. On 23 March, he made his senior international debut in the friendly against Argentina; Italy were defeated 2–0.

Cutrone was a member of Di Biagio's 23-man Italy under-21 side for the 2019 UEFA European Under-21 Championship on home soil; He scored in Italy's final group match – a 3–1 victory over Belgium on 22 June, although Italy were eliminated in the first round after finishing second in their group on goal difference behind Spain following a three–way six–point tie with Spain and Poland; Italy also finished as the second–best second–place team, behind France, who progressed to the semifinals of the competition.

Style of play
Known for his eye for goal, Cutrone has been described as a "true number 9" by several Italian football pundits. His main playing attributes as a forward are his physical strength, positioning, aerial ability, and heading, as well as his opportunism, movement, and ability to read the game; he has also drawn praise in the media for his work-rate off the ball, while his technique and team play have been cited as areas for improvement, however. Due to his characteristics, he has been compared to former Milan striker Filippo Inzaghi, who used to train him while working as a coach with the Milan Youth Sector from 2012 to 2014. Although an avid Milan fan since childhood, he idolized Mattia Destro while playing for Milan Primavera and was also called "the young Destro" because of their similarities. Other players he idolizes are Andrea Belotti and Álvaro Morata, with the latter praising Cutrone for his performances in 2018. Although he is naturally right-footed, he is capable of striking the ball well with either foot.

Apart from his regular position as a central striker, Cutrone has also been used as a makeshift left winger by his former Milan coach Gennaro Gattuso, in a role similar to that of Mario Mandžukić at Juventus. Cutrone is also capable of playing alongside another attacking teammate in a 4–4–2 formation, balancing between the roles of a centre-forward/striker and a second striker.

Former Milan forward Daniele Massaro likened Cutrone to himself in 2019, also referring to the latter as a "supersub," due to his penchant for scoring decisive goals after coming off the bench.

Personal life
In 2021, Cutrone visited the UEFA Euro 2020 Final played in London at Wembley Stadium between Italy and England, cheering his compatriots to victory amongst the crowd of about seven thousand Italian supporters. During the game, he served as an organizer of chants.

On 26 January 2022, his father Pasquale died. Prior to his father's death, during his time with Milan and Fiorentina, Cutrone used to wear the number 63 jersey as a tribute to his father, who was born in 1963.

Career statistics

Club

International

Honours
Italy U19
UEFA European Under-19 Championship runner-up: 2016

References

External links

Patrick Cutrone international caps and goals at figc.it 
Instagram Profile

Living people
1998 births
Sportspeople from Como
Footballers from Lombardy
Association football forwards
Italian footballers
A.C. Milan players
Wolverhampton Wanderers F.C. players
ACF Fiorentina players
Valencia CF players
Empoli F.C. players
Como 1907 players
Serie A players
Serie B players
Premier League players
La Liga players
Italy youth international footballers
Italy under-21 international footballers
Italy international footballers
Italian expatriate footballers
Italian expatriate sportspeople in England
Italian expatriate sportspeople in Spain
Expatriate footballers in England
Expatriate footballers in Spain